B'z is the debut studio album by the Japanese rock duo B'z. It was released on September 21, 1988 and reached #47 on the Japanese charts. The album sold 3,790 copies in its first week and eventually sold 338,360 in total.

The band did not tour in support of the album, because its nine songs were all the material they had at the time, and they felt it would not be a proper show with just 40 minutes of material. Unlike the hard-rocking music that most associate with B'z, the album was very much a product of its times, with synthesizers and samplers sharing equal time with Tak's guitar.

One single was released from the album, "Dakara Sono Te o Hanashite," which released on the same day as the album.

Track listing

Dakara Sono Te o Hanashite 

 is the only single from the album and the debut single by the band, released on September 21, 1988.

The song has been re-recorded twice, first in English for their Bad Communication EP, then as a guitar-driven hard rock version for 2000's B'z The "Mixture". This second version is the one the band now plays live. However, during their 2008 "Pleasure--Glory Days" tour, the original synth-driven version made a rare return, with Tak Matsumoto playing a Yamaha MG-M guitar, something the guitarist hasn't done for years.

Track listing

References 

1988 debut albums
B'z albums
Japanese-language albums